Roddenberry is a crater on Mars, located at 49°S 4°W to the east of Argyre Planitia in Noachis Terra. It measures approximately 139 kilometers in diameter. The crater is named after Gene Roddenberry, creator of the television series Star Trek, and was formally approved by the IAU in 1994.

To the southwest of Roddenberry is the crater Green.

See also
List of craters on Mars

References

Impact craters on Mars
Argyre quadrangle
Gene Roddenberry